Sara Alexandra Lima Tavares (born 1 February 1978) is a Portuguese singer, composer, guitarist and percussionist. She was born and brought up in Lisbon, Portugal, where she still lives. Second-generation Portuguese of Cape Verdean descent, she composes African, Portuguese and North American influenced  world music. She composes in Portuguese and Portuguese-based creole languages. Although Portuguese is the main language of her songs, it's not rare to find in her repertoire multilingual songs mixing Portuguese with Portuguese creole and even English in the same song (e.g."One Love").

Tavares won the 1993/1994 final of the Endemol song contest Chuva de Estrelas (performing Whitney Houston's "One Moment in Time"), which helped her win the Portuguese Television Song Contest final in 1994, consequently earning a place in the 1994 Eurovision Song Contest, with the song "Chamar a Música" reaching 8th place.

She's also known for singing the European-Portuguese version of "God Help the Outcasts" for the Disney movie "The Hunchback of Notre Dame," which won a Disney award for the best version of the original song. She also won a Portuguese Golden Globe for Best Portuguese Singer in 2000.

Early life 
Tavares' parents were immigrants from Cape Verde that settled in Almada in the 70s. While still a child, she was left in the care of an old woman when her father left the family and her mother moved to the south of the country with her younger siblings.

Tavares showed great musical promise from a young age; in 1994 she won the national television song contest Chuva de Estrelas, performing Whitney Houston's "One Moment in Time". That same year, she  won the  Festival da Canção, that earned Tavares a slot in the 1994 Eurovision Song Contest at the age of 16. Her winning song, "Chamar a Música," was featured on her debut EP, Sara Tavares & Shout (1996), where Tavares mixed gospel and funk with her native Portuguese influences.

Her debut album Mi Ma Bô was produced by Lokua Kanza and released in 1999.

In 2017, eight years after Xinti, Tavares released Fitxadu. The album was inspired in Lisbon's different African sounds and cultures and features a more electronic and urban sound than Tavares' previous works. The album received a Latin Grammy nomination for Best Portuguese Language Roots Album.

Artistry
Sara Tavares has named Donny Hathaway, Stevie Wonder, Tina Turner and Aretha Franklin as her favorite childhood artists. Her music is noted to feature a blending of cultures, particularly those of Portugal and Cape Verde. Tavares is among a group of Portuguese-born artists of African origins, that helped bring African influences to mainstream music in Portugal.

Discography 
 Sara Tavares & Shout (1996)
 Mi Ma Bô (1999)
 Balancê (2006)
 Alive! in Lisboa (2008)
 Xinti (2009)
 Fitxadu (2017)

References

Sources

External links

Official Site
Sara Tavares online press kit at rock paper scissors

1978 births
Living people
Eurovision Song Contest entrants of 1994
Eurovision Song Contest entrants for Portugal
21st-century Portuguese women singers
Portuguese guitarists
Portuguese people of Cape Verdean descent
Musicians from Lisbon
Singers from Lisbon
20th-century Portuguese women singers
21st-century guitarists
Golden Globes (Portugal) winners
Women in Latin music
21st-century women guitarists